Christine Nunn, (born 4 April 1991 in Canberra) is a professional squash player who represents Australia. She reached a career-high world ranking of World No. 36 in July 2016.

References

External links 

Australian female squash players
Living people
1991 births
21st-century Australian women